The action of 1595 was an indecisive naval battle between forces of Malta, then under the protection of the Order of Saint John, and Bizerte, then part of the Ottoman Empire.

The battle took place in late June or early July 1595, after five Maltese galleys sailed south from Syracuse and encountered three Bizertine galleys off Longina. Two Maltese galleys failed to engage and the Bizertines escaped. There was some damage on both sides.

Ships involved

Malta
 Capitana
 San Fede
 San Croce
 Vittoria
 San Placido

Bizerte
3 galleys

References
 
 

Conflicts in 1595
1595
1595
1595 in the Ottoman Empire
1590s in Malta